The Quedlinburg Itala fragment (Berlin, Staatsbibliothek Preussischer Kulturbesitz, Cod. theol. lat. fol. 485) is a fragment of six folios from a large 5th-century illuminated manuscript of an Old Latin Itala translation of parts of 1 Samuel of the Old Testament. It was probably produced in Rome in the 420s or 430s. It is the oldest surviving illustrated biblical manuscript and has been in the Berlin State Library since 1875-76.  The pages are approximately 305 x 205 mm large. 

The fragments were found from 1865 onwards (two in 1865, two in 1867, one in 1887) re-used in the bindings of different books that had been bound in the 17th century in the town of Quedlinburg, home of Quedlinburg Abbey, a large Imperial monastery, where the manuscript may well have spent much of its life. 

The illustrations are grouped in framed miniatures occupying an entire page, with between two and five miniatures per page, with the corresponding text being on the other side of the pages; there are fourteen miniatures in total. One folio contains only text.  The illustrations, although much damaged, are done in the illusionistic style of late antiquity.

Style and context
Much of the paint surface is lost revealing the underlying writing that gives instructions to the artist who would execute the pictures, such as: "Make the tomb [by which] Saul and his servant stand and two men, jumping over pits, speak to him and [announce that the asses have been found]. Make Saul by a tree and [his] servant [and three men who talk] to him, one carrying three goats, one [three loaves of bread, one] a wine-skin."  This suggests that the programme of images was newly devised for this volume, rather than merely copying an earlier work.  This, the usual conclusion, was disputed by Ernst Kitzinger, who argued that they were to aid the artist who was copying images from the different format of a scroll.  However Walter Cahn sees the instructions as far more detailed than would be needed for that. Whether original or not, the images are "the fruit of what we must imagine to have been a thoroughly rationalized and quasi-industrial method of production", in "a stable craft with settled routines". They are painted in "an illusionistic style with an emphasis on imperial imagery" (Saul and David are dressed as emperors in military costume), and gold is used for highlights and the tituli or captions to the images.  The text is in a "superior uncial script", while the instructions to the artist are in "an eccentric Roman cursive".  

The full extent of the original manuscript is not known.  Some of the episodes illustrated are very minor, suggesting that the whole manuscript may have been illustrated at this density, which is greater than any later Biblical manuscript; according to Kurt Weitzmann "It staggers the imagination to picture what a fully illustrated manuscript of the two books of Samuel and the two books of Kings must have looked like".  The style suggests it may have been made by the same workshop responsible for the Vergilius Vaticanus, and has links with the mosaics of Santa Maria Maggiore.  According to Kitzinger: "Evidently this book was commissioned by a patron who belonged to the same social stratum as the sponsors of de luxe editions of the classics and who shared many of the same cultural values".  The other very early illustrated biblical manuscripts that have survived are similar densely illustrated texts of specific books from the Old Testament, mostly the Book of Genesis (Vienna Genesis, Cotton Genesis), which, with some specific details of the illustrations, leads scholars to postulate an earlier tradition of Jewish luxury manuscripts, perhaps in scroll format, in the Hellenized Jewish world. The Books of Kings feature strongly in the uniquely extensive wall-paintings of the Dura-Europos Synagogue from the 3rd century. 

The figures have landscape backgrounds, "atmospheric, autumnal settings, with softly shaded skies of pink and light blue", that are "very close" to those of the Vergilius Vaticanus, whereas the Santa Maria Maggiore mosaics see the beginning of the use of a plain gold background in some scenes, the start of what was to become a very common feature in religious art for the next thousand years.  But in many respects, the mosaics look (at the expense of visibility, given their high placement) like enlarged miniatures, just as the miniatures of both manuscripts draw on the styles of larger paintings.

Saul and Samuel

The fragment includes a full page with four miniatures illustrating the episode at 1 Samuel 15:13-33:

Notes

References 
 Cahn, Walter, Romanesque Bible Illumination, Ithaca, New York: Cornell University Press, 1982, 
 Calkins, Robert G. Illuminated Books of the Middle Ages. Ithaca, New York: Cornell University Press, 1983.
 Kitzinger, Ernst, Byzantine art in the making: main lines of stylistic development in Mediterranean art, 3rd-7th century, 1977, Faber & Faber,  (US: Cambridge UP, 1977),
 Weitzmann, Kurt. Late Antique and Early Christian Book Illumination. Chatto & Windus, London (New York: George Braziller) 1977.
 Williams, John (ed),  Imaging the Early Medieval Bible, 2002, Penn State University Press, 2002, 9780271021690, google books

Further reading 
 Beck, C. H., Quedlinburger Itala-miniaturen der Königlichen bibliothek in Berlin, 1898, Munich, Open Library Online text (in German)
 H. Degering - A Boeckler, Die Quedlinburger Italafragmente, Berlin, 1932.
 Levin, Inabelle. The Quedlinburg Itala: The oldest Illustrated Biblical Manuscript.  Leiden: E.J. Brill, 1985.
 Lowden, John: Early Christian and Byzantine Art, Phaidon, 57-59 pp.
Weitzmann, Kurt, ed., Age of spirituality: late antique and early Christian art, third to seventh century (online as PDF), no. 424, 1979, Metropolitan Museum of Art, New York,

External links

 SSB

Illuminated biblical manuscripts
5th-century illuminated manuscripts
Late Roman Empire art
Early Christian art
Vetus Latina manuscripts